Foxdale is a rural locality in the Whitsunday Region, Queensland, Australia. In the  Foxdale had a population of 127 people.

Geography 
Foxale is farming district located to the north west of Proserpine.

The town is situated between the Proserpine River to the south west and the Bruce Highway and North Coast railway line to the west. The locality was originally served by the Foxdale railway station but this station has been abandoned.

History 
The name of the district derives from that of a former property owner and early pioneer in the area called Isaac Alexander Fox (who died in 1918 and is buried in the Proserpine Cemetery).

Foxdale Provisional School opened on 2 June 1904. On 1 January 1909 it became Foxdale State School. It closed on 1972.

In the  Foxdale had a population of 127 people.

References

External links 
Map of Foxdale
Information about Foxdale railway station

Whitsunday Region
Localities in Queensland